The Regional District of Fraser–Fort George (RDFFG) is a regional district located in the Central Interior of British Columbia. It is bounded by the Alberta border to the east, the Columbia–Shuswap and Thompson–Nicola regional districts to the south and southeast, Cariboo Regional District to the southwest, the Regional District of Bulkley–Nechako to the west, and the Peace River Regional District to the north and northeast. As of the Canada 2011 Census, Fraser–Fort George had a population of 91,879 and a land area of 51,083.73 km2 (19,723.54 sq mi). The offices of the regional district are located at Prince George.

Communities

Cities
Prince George

District Municipality
Mackenzie

Villages
McBride
Valemount

Regional District Electoral Areas
Fraser–Fort George A - Salmon River–Lakes
Fraser–Fort George C - Chilako River–Nechako
Fraser–Fort George D - Tabor Lake–Stone Creek
Fraser–Fort George E - Woodpecker–Hixon
Fraser–Fort George F - Willow River–Upper Fraser
Fraser–Fort George G - Crooked River–Parsnip
Fraser–Fort George H - Robson Valley–Canoe

Indian Reserves
NB Indian Reserves are not part of municipal or regional district governance and are outside the regional district's jurisdiction, and also counted separately in the census figures. 
Fort George (Shelley) Indian Reserve No. 2
McLeod Lake Indian Reserve No. 1
Parsnip Indian Reserve No. 5

Designated Places
Bear Lake
Salmon Valley
Summit Lake
Willow River

Demographics

Note: Totals greater than 100% due to multiple origin responses.

Notes

References

Statistics Canada 2006 Community Profile: Fraser–Fort George (Regional district)

External links

 
Fraser-Fort George